IONIS School of Technology and Management (IONIS STM) is a French private graduate school, part of the  IONIS Education Group, that offers instruction in  information technology, computer science, energy, biotechnology and management.
It was established in 2009 in Ivry-sur-Seine.

The school offers a Master of Business Administration recognized by French government and teaches both technical and management aspects.

A  special feature  of the school is to admit students holder of a Bachelor, a Master or a Ph.D.

History 
In 2002, the grande école EPITA creates specialization programs called Mastères EPITA. After 7 years, decided to create a separate  school for all the specializations and to extend them to new sectors.

Curriculum 

The course is in two years after a Bachelor's degree. The school admits students after a two-years studies. In that case, the course is in one more year, called "preparatory year". Students can also enter in the school after a master's degree. The preparatory year is a general course studies in management and computer science, including lessons corresponding to the specialization followed. The year ends by a three-months internship. After a Bachelor's degree, students are split in four specializations : information technology, computer science, energy, biotechnology. From October to June, they follow an academic programme and then perform a six-months internship.

Bibliography 
 La double compétence : l’antidote à l’obsolescence professionnelle, Ivry-sur-Seine, FYP Éditions, 2019, 192 p.

References

External links 
 Official website

Business schools in France
Technical universities and colleges in France
Universities in Île-de-France
Educational institutions established in 2009
Buildings and structures in Val-de-Marne
2009 establishments in France